The Siamese leaf-toed gecko (Dixonius siamensis) is a species of gecko found in South Asia. This is the type species of the genus Dixonius, named after James R. Dixon from Texas A&M University.

Distribution
Bangladesh, India, Thailand, Annam, Siam (Dung-Phya-Fai), Myanmar, Vietnam, Laos, Cambodia?
Type locality: Dung-Phya Fai Mountains, eastern Siam.

References
 Annandale, N. 1905 Notes on some Oriental geckos in the Indian Museum, Calcutta, with descriptions of new tons. Ann. Mag. nat. Hist. (7) 15:26-32
 Bauer A M.  Good D A.  Branch W R. 1997 The taxonomy of the Southern African leaf-toed geckos (Squamata: Gekkonidae), with a review of Old World "Phyllodactylus" and the description of five new genera. PROCEEDINGS OF THE CALIFORNIA ACADEMY OF SCIENCES.  49 (14): 447–497.
 Bauer, A.M.; Sumontha, M.; Grossmann, W.; Pauwels, O.S.G. & Vogel, G. 2004 A new species of Dixonius (Squamata: Gekkonidae) from Kanchanaburi Province, Western Thailand. Current Herpetology 23 (1): 17-26

External links
 

Fauna of Southeast Asia
Geckos of Thailand
Taxa named by George Albert Boulenger
Reptiles described in 1899
Dixonius